6-Pack is an EP by American country music duo Florida Georgia Line. It was released on May 22, 2020 under BMLG Records. The EP includes the single "I Love My Country" as well as the track "Second Guessing" from the duo’s appearance on Songland. All six songs from the EP are included on the duo’s fifth studio album Life Rolls On.

Track listing

Personnel

Florida Georgia Line
Tyler Hubbard - vocals
Brian Kelley - vocals

Additional Personnel
Tyler Chiarelli - electric guitar
Dave Cohen - Hammond B-3 organ, synthesizer
Corey Crowder - programming, background vocals
Andrew DeRoberts - electric guitar, programming
Todd Lombardo - banjo, acoustic guitar, electric guitar, mandolin
Tony Lucido - bass guitar
Jerry Roe - drums, percussion
Jake Rose - banjo, acoustic guitar, programming
Jimmie Lee Sloas - bass guitar
Ilya Toshinsky - banjo, acoustic guitar
Derek Wells - dobro, electric guitar, steel guitar
Alex Wright - Hammond B-3 organ, keyboards, piano, synthesizer

Charts

Weekly charts

Year-end charts

References

2020 EPs
Big Machine Records EPs
Florida Georgia Line EPs